Bela Bose (1943 or 1944 – 20 February 2023) was an Indian dancer and actress who was active in Hindi films during the 1960s and 1970s.

Early life 
Bela Bose was born in Calcutta on 1 January 1943 into a well-to-do family. Her father was a cloth merchant and her mother was a homemaker. Following a bank crash that wiped out their fortune, the family relocated to Bombay in 1951. As a schoolgirl, she started her career as a group dancer in films to help support her family after her father's death in a road accident. She appeared in more films after she finished her schooling.

Career 
Bela Bose began to receive independent credit from the late 1950s. Her big break came when she was asked to perform a dance number with Raj Kapoor in Main Nashe Mein Hoon, released in 1959. Her first leading role was at age 21 in Sautela Bhai (1962) opposite Guru Dutt. She honed her acting skills performing in Bengali plays. Her career consisted of more than 150 films. In Hawa Mahal (1962), she played the role of Helen's sister. She was often called upon to play the role of a vamp. Conservative in real life, she lost some roles because of her refusal to wear a swimming suit onscreen.

Bose performed in such films as Bimal Roy's Bandini (1963), F.C. Mehra's Professor (1962) and Amrapali, Atmaram's Shikar, Umang,Yeh Gulistan Hamara, Dil Aur Mohabbat, Zindagi Aur Maut, and Wahan Ke Log. She later became a character actress and played the villainous sister-in-law in Jai Santoshi Maa.

Her husband, Ashish Kumar, was an actor. They married in 1967 and she gradually eased out of acting after giving birth to a daughter and a son.

Death
Bose died on 20 February 2023, at the age of 79.

Selected filmography

References

External links
 

1940s births
2023 deaths
Actresses in Hindi cinema
Indian film actresses
Indian female dancers
20th-century Indian actresses
Actresses from Kolkata